Torrey Folk (born December 10, 1973) is an American rower. She competed in the women's eight event at the 2000 Summer Olympics.

References

External links
 

1973 births
Living people
American female rowers
Olympic rowers of the United States
Rowers at the 2000 Summer Olympics
Sportspeople from Ann Arbor, Michigan
21st-century American women